Enrique Chediak (born 1967) is an Ecuadorian cinematographer.

Life and career 
Chediak was born in Quito, Ecuador. He studied communication science in Santiago de Chile and photography in Madrid before studying film at New York University  from 1992 to 1996. He participated in the production of American Southern—released in 1995 and directed by John Joshua Clayton—as a Cameraman. Another film he worked on in 2010, the drama 127 Hours, was based on a true story. Chediak collaborated with the British cinematographer Anthony Dod Mantle and was subsequently nominated for several awards, including the 2011 British Academy Film Award for the Best Cinematography.

Filmography

Television

Short films

Other credits

Awards (selection) 
 British Independent Film Awards 2007:  Nomination  for the best technique for  28 Weeks Later 
 Online Film Critics Society Award 2010:  Nomination  for the  127 Hours 
 British Academy Film Award 2011:  Nomination  for Best Cinematography for  127 Hours

References

External links 
 
 Official website
 S. Torriano Berry, Venise T. Berry. Historical Dictionary of African American Cinema

Cinematographers
Ecuadorian film people
1967 births
Living people
People from Quito
Ecuadorian emigrants to the United States
Ecuadorian film directors